Alfred Henry Lewis (January 20, 1855 – December 23, 1914) was an American investigative journalist, lawyer, novelist, editor, and short story writer, who sometimes published under the pseudonym Dan Quin.

Career
Lewis began as a staff writer at the Chicago Times, and eventually became editor of the Chicago Times-Herald. By the late 19th century he was writing muckraker articles for Cosmopolitan. As an investigative journalist, Lewis wrote extensively about corruption in New York politics. In 1901 he published a biography of Richard Croker (1843–1922), a leading figure in the corrupt political machine known as Tammany Hall, which exercised a great deal of control over New York politics from the 1790s to the 1960s.

As a writer of genre fiction, his most successful works were Westerns from his Wolfville series, which he continued writing until he died of gastrointestinal disease in 1914.

Bibliography

Non-fiction
 Richard Croker (1901)
 Nation-famous New York Murders (1914)

Novels and short story collections

References

External links

 
 
 
 

1855 births
1914 deaths
19th-century American novelists
20th-century American novelists
American investigative journalists
American male novelists
Ohio lawyers
Lawyers from Cleveland
Western (genre) writers
American male short story writers
20th-century American biographers
19th-century American short story writers
19th-century American male writers
20th-century American short story writers
Journalists from Ohio
20th-century American male writers
Novelists from Ohio
19th-century American lawyers
American male biographers